The 2003–04 Heineken Cup was the ninth season for which European teams competed for the Heineken Cup. Competing teams, from England, France, Ireland, Italy, Scotland and Wales, were divided into six pools of four, in which teams played home and away matches against each other. The winners of the pools, together with the two best runners-up, qualified for the knock-out stage.

This was the first competition in the series to employ the bonus point system for classifying teams. In prior competitions, teams earned two points for a win and one for a draw. Starting with the 2003–04 competition, teams earned points in the pool matches under the following scenarios: 
 Four points for a win
 Two points for a draw
 One bonus point for scoring four or more tries, regardless of the final score
 One bonus point for losing by seven points or less

Teams

Pool stage

Pool 1

Pool 2

Pool 3

Pool 4

Pool 5

Pool 6

Seeding and runners-up

Knockout stage

Quarter-finals

Semi-finals

Final

 
Heineken Cup seasons